Pedro Nava may refer to:
Pedro Nava (writer), Brazilian writer
Pedro Nava (politician), California State Assemblyman